The College World Series Most Outstanding Player is an award for the best individual performance during the College World Series in Omaha, Nebraska. The recipient of the award is announced at the completion of the College World Series Championship Game. The award is similar to Major League Baseball's World Series Most Valuable Player award.

Since 1999, the winner of the award has received a miniature replica of "The Road to Omaha" sculpture, which is situated at TD Ameritrade Park Omaha. The award measures 16 inches high.  There have been 10 recipients of this award who were on not on the winning team of the College World Series.  The College World Series started in 1947 but the award was not given out until 1949.

Voting process
The press attending the championship series vote on the Most Outstanding Player during the game. In the fifth inning, ballots are distributed. The voting is closed by the eighth inning. The Most Outstanding Player is announced following the awarding of trophies to the runner-up and championship teams. If a third game of the championship series is necessary, the ballots taken during the second game are discarded, and a new round of balloting is conducted during the third and deciding game.

List

See also

List of college baseball awards

References

External links
Most Outstanding Player Award in College World Series (Baseball-Almanac)
Most Outstanding Player Award. College World Series official website. Retrieved 2009-09-04.

Most Outstanding Player
College baseball trophies and awards in the United States
Most valuable player awards
Awards established in 1949
1949 establishments in the United States